Kharalambos Zouras (January 1, 1885 – 1972) was a Greek athlete who competed in the 1908 Summer Olympics. He was born in Vourvoura, Arcadia.

In 1908 he finished fourth in the freestyle javelin competition. He also participated in the javelin throw event but the result is unknown.

References

External links
 list of Greek athletes 

1885 births
1972 deaths
Greek male javelin throwers
Olympic athletes of Greece
Athletes (track and field) at the 1908 Summer Olympics
People from Arcadia, Peloponnese
Sportspeople from the Peloponnese